The 2008–09 Superliga Espanola de Hockey Hielo season was the 35th season of the Superliga Espanola de Hockey Hielo, the top level of ice hockey in Spain. Seven teams participated in the league, and FC Barcelona won the championship.

Standings

Playoffs

Pre-Playoffs 
 CH Gasteiz – CH Jaca 0:2 (5:9, 1:10)
 CH Txuri Urdin – Majadahonda HC 1:2 (2:3, 6:5 SO, 1:4)

Semifinals 
 Majadahonda HC – FC Barcelona 0:2 (1:6, 2:8)
 CH Jaca – CG Puigcerdà 1:2 (5:6 SO, 4:3 OT, 3:9)

Final 
 CG Puigcerdà – FC Barcelona 0:2 (5:6, 2:5)

External links
Season on hockeyarchives.info

Liga Nacional de Hockey Hielo seasons
Spa
Liga